Druschel is a German surname. Notable people with the surname include:

 Alfred Druschel (1917–1945), German combat pilot
 Desi Druschel, American baseball coach
 Peter Druschel (born 1959), German computer scientist
 Rick Druschel (born 1952), American football player

German-language surnames